Bernhard Kempa (19 November 1920 – 20 July 2017) was a German handball player and coach. He was born in Oppeln, Upper Silesia (Opole, Poland). As a national team player he became world champion in field handball in 1952 and 1955.

Career
In the next few years, Frisch Auf Göppingen dominated the handball in Germany, as Kempa made a significant contribution as the outstanding player. Kempa won the German championship for Göppingen one more time in the hall (1955) and in the field (1957).  As a Göppinger coach, he did so in the indoor handball five more times (1958-1961, 1970), and Kempa also took the Europapokal in 1960. 

In the history books of handball he has entered with his Kempa trick, a throwing combination, in which a player is played as he jumps into the circle; The player who crosses the circle catches the ball in the air and still throws during the jump on the gate.

According to Kempa is also the sports article brand Kempa under which Uhlsport sports articles distributed around the handball sport.

Honors
In 2011, Bernhard Kempa was admitted to Germany's Sports Hall of Fame.

Death
Kempa died in Bad Boll, Germany on 20 July 2017 at the age of 96.

References

External links

 
 Eintrag im Sportbuch Band 1 (PDF; 3,6 MB)

1920 births
2017 deaths
German male handball players
German handball coaches
Sportspeople from Opole
People from the Province of Upper Silesia
Recipients of the Cross of the Order of Merit of the Federal Republic of Germany
Recipients of the Order of Merit of Baden-Württemberg
Sportswear brands